Ioritz Landeta Batiz (born 10 October 1995) is a Spanish professional footballer who plays for Arenas Club de Getxo as a goalkeeper.

Club career
Landeta played for a host of clubs during his youth, and in May 2015 he signed for Zamudio SD in Tercera División, from Gatika FT. In July 2016 he moved to Deportivo Alavés, being initially assigned to the reserves also in the fourth division.

In July 2018, Landeta was loaned to Alavés' affiliate club NK Istra 1961, for one season. He made his professional debut on 18 August, starting in a 1–2 Croatian First Football League home loss against NK Lokomotiva.

On 21 July 2019, Landeta signed for fourth division side Sestao River Club.

References

External links

1995 births
Living people
Spanish footballers
Sportspeople from Biscay
Footballers from the Basque Country (autonomous community)
Association football goalkeepers
Segunda División B players
Tercera División players
Danok Bat CF players
Zamudio SD players
Deportivo Alavés B players
Sestao River footballers
Club Portugalete players
Arenas Club de Getxo footballers
Croatian Football League players
NK Istra 1961 players
Spanish expatriate footballers
Spanish expatriate sportspeople in Croatia
Expatriate footballers in Croatia